The final of the 2007–08 OFC Champions League was played between Waitakere United of New Zealand and Kossa FC of the Solomon Islands.

The first leg was played in the Lawson Tama Stadium, Honiara, Solomon Islands on the April 26, 2008. The home team won 3–1.

The second leg was played in the Trusts Stadium, Waitakere City, New Zealand on the May 11, 2008. Waitakere United won 5–0, 6–3 on aggregate and advanced to the 2008 FIFA Club World Cup.

First Match

Second Match

Champion

References
OceaniaFootball

OFC Champions League finals